Blidö is an island in the northern Stockholm archipelago "roslagen" and a part of the Norrtälje Municipality. Its northernmost point is called Kråknäset.

Journalist and author Ture Nerman owned a summer house on Blidö from 1919 until 1969.

References

Islands of Norrtälje Municipality
Islands of the Stockholm archipelago